The Tasmanian Environmental Protection Authority(EPA) is an agency of the Tasmanian government.

The EPA works with the Environmental Management and Pollution Control Act 1994 and is involved in Tasmania's Resource Management and Planning System.  It also works with the Tasmanian Department of Primary Industries, Parks, Water and Environment.

Notes

External links
 [http://epa.tas.gov.au/epa EPA official site
 DPIPWE official site

Government agencies of Tasmania
Environment of Tasmania
Environmental agencies in Australia